The following lists events that happened during 2013 in Latvia.

Incumbents
 President - Andris Bērziņš
 Prime Minister - Valdis Dombrovskis

Events

March
 March 4 - Latvia applies to enter the eurozone in 2014, in a move which could see it become the 18th member of the bloc.
 March 29 - More than 220 people are rescued from two ice floes that broke off of Latvia and were blown into the Gulf of Riga.

June
 June 20 - A major fire breaks out at the Riga Castle, the Latvian presidential palace.
 June 21 - Riga Castle fire
 Latvian authorities say the overnight fire has extensively damaged Riga Castle, the medieval fortress that houses the Baltic nation's National History Museum, and presidential residence.

November
 November 21 - 54 people are killed and 55 injured at the Zolitūde shopping centre roof collapse in Riga.

References

 
2010s in Latvia
Years of the 21st century in Latvia
Latvia
Latvia